The 2008 All-Pacific-10 Conference football team consists of American football players chosen by various organizations for All-Pacific-10 Conference teams for the 2008 college football season. The USC Trojans won the conference, posting an 8–1 conference record. USC then beat the Big Ten champion Penn State Nittany Lions in the Rose Bowl 38 to 24. Oregon State running back Jacquizz Rodgers was voted Pac-10 Offensive Player of the Year. USC linebacker Rey Maualuga was voted Pat Tillman Pac-10 Defensive Player of the Year.

Offensive selections

Quarterbacks
Mark Sanchez, USC (Coaches-1, ESPN-1, Rivals-1)
Willie Tuitama, Arizona (Coaches-2, Rivals-2)

Running backs
Jacquizz Rodgers#, Oregon St. (Coaches-1, ESPN-1, Rivals-1)
Jahvid Best, California (Coaches-1, ESPN-1, Rivals-1)
Toby Gerhart, Stanford (Coaches-2, Rivals-2)
Jeremiah Johnson, Oregon (Coaches-2, Rivals-2)

Wide receivers
Mike Thomas, Arizona (Coaches-1, ESPN-1, Rivals-1)
Sammie Stroughter, Oregon St. (Coaches-1, ESPN-1, Rivals-1)
Michael Jones, Arizona St. (Coaches-2, Rivals-2)
Patrick Turner, USC (Coaches-2)
Damian Williams, USC (Rivals-2)

Tight ends
Rob Gronkowski, Arizona (Coaches-1, ESPN-1, Rivals-1)
Ed Dickson, Oregon (Coaches-2)
Ryan Moya, UCLA (Coaches-2)
Cameron Morrah, California (Rivals-2)

Tackles
Andy Levitre, Oregon St. (Coaches-1, ESPN-1, Rivals-1)
Eben Britton, Arizona (Coaches-1, ESPN-1, Rivals-1)
Ben Muth, Stanford (Coaches-1, Rivals-2)
Fenuki Tupou, Oregon (Coaches-2, Rivals-2)

Guards
Jeff Byers, USC (Coaches-2, Rivals-1)
Mark Lewis, Oregon (Rivals-1)
Adam Speer, Oregon St. (Coaches-2, Rivals-2)
Noris Malele, California (Coaches-2)
Joe Longacre, Arizona (Rivals-2)

Centers
Alex Mack, California (Coaches-1, ESPN-1, Rivals-1)
Max Unger, Oregon (Coaches-1, ESPN-1, Rivals-2)
Kris O'Dowd, USC (Coaches-1, ESPN-1)
Alex Fletcher, Stanford (Coaches-2)

Defensive selections

Ends
Nick Reed, Oregon (Coaches-1, ESPN-1, Rivals-1)
Victor Butler, Oregon St. (Coaches-1, ESPN-1, Rivals-1)
Clay Matthews, USC (Coaches-2, Rivals-2)
Tyson Alaulu, California (Coaches-2)
Daniel Te'o-Nesheim, Washington (Coaches-2)
Dexter Davis, Arizona St. (Rivals-2)

Tackles
Fili Moala, USC (Coaches-1, ESPN-1, Rivals-1)
Brian Price, UCLA (Coaches-1, ESPN-1)
Brigham Harwell, UCLA (Coaches-2, Rivals-1)
Stephen Paea, Oregon St. (Rivals-2)
Lawrence Guy, Arizona St. (Rivals-2)

Linebackers
Brian Cushing, USC (Coaches-1, ESPN-1, Rivals-1)
Rey Maualuga,  USC (Coaches-1, ESPN-1, Rivals-1)
Zack Follett, California (Coaches-1, ESPN-1, Rivals-1)
Reggie Carter, UCLA (Coaches-2, Rivals-2)
Kaluka Maiava, USC (Coaches-2)
Keaton Kristick, Oregon St. (Coaches-2)
Mike Nixon, Arizona St. (Rivals-2)
Spencer Paysinger, Oregon (Rivals-2)

Cornerbacks
Syd'Quan Thompson, California (Coaches-1, ESPN-1, Rivals-1)
Alterraun Verner, UCLA (Coaches-2, ESPN-1, Rivals-2)
Brandon Hughes, Oregon St. (Coaches-2, Rivals-1)
Devin Ross, Arizona (Coaches-2, Rivals-2)

Safeties
Taylor Mays, USC (Coaches-1, ESPN-1, Rivals-1)
Kevin Ellison#, USC (Coaches-1, ESPN-1)
Troy Nolan, Arizona St; (Coaches-2, ESPN-1, Rivals-2)
Patrick Chung, Oregon (Coaches-1, Rivals-2)
Jairus Byrd, Oregon (Coaches-1)
Bo McNally, Stanford (Rivals-1)
Greg Laybourn, Oregon St. (Coaches-2)

Special teams

Placekickers
Kai Forbath, UCLA (Coaches-2, ESPN-1, Rivals-1)
David Buehler, USC (Coaches-1)
Jason Bondzio, Arizona (Rivals-2)

Punters
Aaron Perez, UCLA (Coaches-1, ESPN-1, Rivals-2)
Bryan Anger, California (Coaches-2, Rivals-1)

Return specialists 
James Rodgers, Oregon St. (Coaches-1, ESPN-1, Rivals-1)
Mike Thomas, Arizona (Coaches-1, Rivals-1)
Jairus Byrd, Oregon (ESPN-1)
Terence Austin, UCLA (Coaches-2, Rivals-2)
Sammie Stroughter, Oregon St. (Coaches-2)
Kyle Williams, Arizona St. (Rivals-2)

Special teams player
Patrick Chung, Oregon (Coaches-1)
Wopamo Osaisai, Stanford (Coaches-2)

Key
Coaches = selected by Pac-12 coaches

ESPN = selected by ESPN.com staff

Rivals = selected by Rivals.com staff

# = unanimous selection by coaches

See also
2008 College Football All-America Team

References

All-Pacific-10 Conference Football Team
All-Pac-12 Conference football teams